Doctor Pong, also known as Puppy Pong, is an adaption of the original arcade Pong for use in a non-coin-operated environment. It was conceptualized by Nolan Bushnell, Steve Bristow, and a marketing firm to move their arcade video games into a non-arcade environment—in this case, to help occupy children in pediatricians' waiting rooms. Originally designed to be a model of Snoopy's doghouse with Pong built into the side of it, when Charles Schulz declined Atari the use of Snoopy, the model was changed to a generic doghouse with a puppy looking over the top. Puppy Pong saw a limited production run and was tested at Chuck E. Cheese's early locations.

Development
The original Snoopy Pong cabinet was designed by Regan Cheng of the Atari Industrial Design group. The follow-up Puppy Pong cabinet was designed by Regan's manager, Chas Grossman.

Both cabinets consisted of a doghouse housing a Pong board modified to not use a coin drop as a start trigger. The original Pong automatically starts several seconds after a coin is inserted. In Doctor Pong and Puppy Pong, a "start button" was instead wired up to start the games, set under the vertically mounted television in the dog house "roof." Instead of a traditional control panel, spinners are mounted directly on the roof, as well.

References

External links
 A photograph of the original Snoopy Pong version.
 

1975 video games
Arcade video games
Arcade-only video games
Discrete video arcade games
Pong variations
Video games developed in the United States